Ben Spencer may refer to:

Ben Spencer (baseball) (1890–1970), American baseball outfielder
Ben Spencer (rugby union) (born 1992), English rugby union player
Ben Spencer (soccer) (born 1995), American soccer player
Ben Spencer (politician) (born 1981), British MP elected 2019